Grand Saline is a city in Van Zandt County, Texas, United States, located in East Texas. The population was 3,136 as of 2010. Grand Saline is the third largest city in Van Zandt County and is located roughly 75 miles (120 km) east of Dallas and 35 miles (56 km) northwest of Tyler, the two nearest metropolitan areas, and is part of the greater Tyler/Longview area.

The town derives its name from the large salt deposits located southeast of the city, the majority of which are owned by Morton Salt.

History

Grand Saline's first settlers were the ancient Caddo Indians and Cherokee Indians tribes who discovered and made use of a large salt prairie south of the town. The Native Americans used evaporated salt from the brine stream that flows over the flats as a commodity they traded for other needed goods.  By the mid-nineteenth century, the tribes had been forced out of the area by Mirabeau B. Lamar, second president of the Republic of Texas and by general anti-Indian sentiment and moved southeast. Only a few years after the Indians left the salt prairie behind, a new group of settlers arrived. A settler named John Jordan and other settlers brought their families and set up a primitive salt works. The community named Jordan's Saline quickly became the center of Van Zandt County and was, for a while the county seat.

The salt produced here was used in the process of tanning leather and preserving food stuffs. Following the American Civil War the Texas and Pacific Railroad was extended from Marshall to Dallas. A parcel of land was donated to the railroad and a depot was built and the stop was named Grand Saline. The City of Grand Saline was incorporated in 1895 and the community of Jordan's Saline faded into history as its residents moved north to the bustling new city.

There were formerly numerous salt companies in Grand Saline, including the Richardson Salt works, which had drilled the first salt well; the Lone Star Salt Company, Kleer Salt Works, the first steam powered salt plant; and the Grand Saline Salt Company which later became the Morton Salt Company. During the late 1920s, the discovery of the nearby Van, Texas oil field brought companies that provided needed supplies. In the 1930s Grand Saline had twelve petroleum supply companies and five lumber companies. In the Depression years, local sewing rooms made garments for the poor. During World War II, a worker's strike at Morton Salt led the town to form the Grand Saline Industrial Foundation to attract new business to town. Their efforts produced clothing manufacturers, sulfur processing and meat packing companies.  Grand Saline was also known for its Lone Star Hotel which was, for a brief time, the home of Hollywood starlet Louise Fazenda, the wife of Warner Brothers executive Hal Wallis. Agriculture, farming, and ranching have long been a major part of the economic life in Grand Saline. Crops have included sweet potatoes and other truck crops. A cotton gin built south of town in 1890 marked the beginning of many years of cotton production. Poultry, livestock, dairy products, lumber and an Ice House all played a role in the formation and history of the town.

Geography

Grand Saline is located at  (32.677662, –95.711521), in the northeastern area of Van Zandt County, at the intersection of Texas State Highway 110 and U.S. Route 80 in western East Texas. According to the United States Census Bureau, the city has a total area of 2.0 square miles (5.2 km2), of which 2.0 square miles (5.2 km2) is land and 0.50% is water.

Topography
Grand Saline is located in the East Central Texas forests ecoregion. Grand Saline's rural scenery is a mix of rolling hills and open pastures. The area around it is home to numerous creeks, streams, and areas of hardwood timber. The town is located in the Sabine River valley as the river flows just north of the city and then bends south flowing under U.S. Highway 80 east of Grand Saline.

Transportation

Grand Saline is served by the following roadways-

Texas State Highway 110- Grand Saline serves as the northern end to the highway, 110 is the main and preferred route from the Van/Grand Saline area into Tyler, Texas.  (North of the intersection of 110 and US 80, the highway bears the name Chris Tomlin Boulevard, in honor of the Contemporary Christian musician who is a Grand Saline native.)
U.S. Highway 80- Marked as Garland Street in the City, Runs east towards the Longview/Marshall area and to the Louisiana state line and West to the Dallas/Ft. Worth Metroplex 
FM 17- Runs south to Canton, Texas and North to Lake Fork.
FM 857-Grand Saline serves as the northern end, and runs south into Smith County.

Grand Saline is also roughly 15 minutes north of Interstate 20.

Education

Grand Saline is served by the Grand Saline Independent School District. College students who reside in the Grand Saline ISD are served by Tyler Junior College, as Grand Saline ISD is in the TJC taxing and service district.

Demographics

As of the 2020 United States census, there were 3,107 people, 1,069 households, and 727 families residing in the city.

Media
Grand Saline has two local newspapers, the Grand Saline Sun and the Van Zandt News which are published weekly and cover local news, and also has daily newspapers delivered to residents such as The Dallas Morning News and the Tyler Morning Telegraph. Grand Saline residents receive television channels from the Dallas/Ft. Worth media market and the Tyler/Longview market. The same applies to radio stations as residents can receive radio stations from both the Dallas/Ft. Worth and the Tyler, Texas, markets.

Healthcare
Grand Saline operated Texas General Hospital-Van Zandt, a level 4 trauma emergency room hospital with 52 beds that opened in the same building as the former Cozby-Germany Hospital in April 2015. The city also is home to three assisted living centers and provides EMS services and an ambulance station. As of August 2019, the hospital has been permanently closed.

Notable people

 Charles R. Moore, Methodist minister, human rights activist and subject of the 2018 documentary film Man on Fire about his 2014 self-immolation in Grand Saline
 Chris Tomlin, award-winning Christian songwriter

Photo gallery

References

External links

 

Cities in Texas
Cities in Van Zandt County, Texas